Located principally in the city centre or Cercado de Lima and Rímac areas, the Historic Centre of Lima is among the most important tourist destinations in Peru.

Foundation

The city of Lima, the capital of Peru, was founded by Francisco Pizarro on 18 January 1535 and given the name City of the Kings. Nevertheless, with time its original name persisted, which may come from one of two sources: Either the Aymara language lima-limaq (meaning "yellow flower"), or the Spanish pronunciation of the Quechuan word rimaq (meaning "talker", and actually written and pronounced limaq in the nearby Quechua I languages). It is worth nothing that the same Quechuan word is also the source of the name given to the river that feeds the city, the Rímac River (pronounced as in the politically dominant Quechua II languages, with an "r" instead of an "l"). Early maps of Peru show the two names displayed jointly.

In 1988, UNESCO declared the historic center of Lima a World Heritage Site for its originality and high concentration of historic monuments constructed in the time of Spanish presence.

Balconies of Lima

Of the structures in the historical center of Lima, situated are more than 1,600  balconies that were built in the viceroyalty era as well as in the republic. In order to retain its conservation, the Municipality of Lima has invited individuals and companies to adopt a balcony in order to maintain them as if they were new. The abundance of these balconies adds to the particular harmony and originality to this part of the city.

Colonial extravagance
At the time of the Viceroyalty of Peru, a work of art was created, a magnificence, a grandeur and a legendary royal life.

The authority of the viceroy, like representative of the Spanish monarchy was particularly important, since its appointment supposed an important ascent and the successful culmination of a race in the colonial administration.

The entrances to Lima of the new viceroys were specially lavish. For the occasion, the streets were paved with silver bars from the doors of the city of Lima to the Palace of the Viceroy.

Principal Monuments

Archbishop Palace

The Archbishop Palace is the home of the Archbishop of Lima. It is a popular tourist attraction in the Historical centre of Lima, Peru. The first major church began construction in 1535. Pope Paul III turned it into an episcopal seat in 1541. In 1547, Lima was elevated to an archdiocese, which turned it by a short period, in the more extensive ecclesiastical circumscription of the world.
The patron of the episcopal seat is Saint Rosa of Lima.

Museum of Italian Art

The Museum of Italian Art is the only European arts museum of Peru. It has a wide collection of paintings, sculptures, drawings, prints and ceramics that belong to Italian artists from the beginnings of the 20th century, as well as a collection of 35 contemporary Italian paintings.

House of Aliaga
This house was constructed in 1535 on a pre-Columbian sanctuary.
It was constructed on the date, that is shared with that of the foundation of the city, it has been inhabited permanently by the descendants of the first proprietor, Jerónimo de Aliaga, standard-bearer and exchequer for Francisco Pizarro.
This home is the oldest mansion of the city and  faces the Government Palace, former seat of Pizarro's rule, in a lateral street.
Their halls, extensive and luxurious and their inner patio, have all the characteristics of the most important mansions of the historical center of Lima of the viceroyalty time.
Given the perfect state of conservation, in special circumstances, this mansion often hosts certain cultural events.  The mansion, still a private home, can be visited by pre-arrangement with an entry fee of approximately $11 US.

House of Oidor

In this house, one of oldest of the city, lived the Oidor, that was named by the Spanish monarchy to act in the colonial administration. The Oidor had by functions to cross the administered territory to control its government. In this sense, it advised to the viceroy as a consultant.

House of Pilatos
This is one of the oldest houses of Lima, constructed in 1590 by a Jesuit priest by the name of Ruiz Portillo. The name of this large house was given by the Spaniards who arrived and stated the similarity of the house with one in Seville.

Goyeneche House
This is one of the most outstanding houses of the historical center, constructed in the middle of the 18th century with French influence. One is in its original state with its balconies a typical characteristic of colonial Lima.

Riva Agüero House
This house was constructed in the 18th century by the Riva Agüero family, whose last member, the intellectual José de la Riva-Agüero, donated it to the Pontifical Catholic University of Peru. At the present time Agüero is used like headquarters of the Riva Institute, conserving an interesting historical file and a library being simultaneously used by the local Museum of Popular Art of the PUCP.

Basílica Cathedral

Construction was begun on the Cathedral of Lima in 1535—the same year the city was founded. The Cathedral of Lima displays architecture typical of the Spanish colonial era. The pews of the cathedral and the benches of the choir are of the finest quality. The Greater Altar is gold plated and has images of the colonial era. Within the cathedral are the ashes of Francisco Pizarro, the founder of Lima. Every year, in the month patriotism, is celebrated the mass Te Deum in gratefulness by the independence from Spain. A custom retaken by the Cardinal Juan Luis Cipriani, is to give the mass all Sundays at 11:00 a.m. In 2005 the mayor of Lima created the project of illuminating the exterior of the cathedral with new lights.

Basílica of Our Lady of the Rosary and Convent of Santo Domingo

It took more than five decades delay for the construction of the church and the Convent of Santo Domingo, because the project begun at the same time as the foundation of Lima and the end of the 16th century marked by the end of it. The church is composed by three naves with a carved choral ashlar masonry in cedar wood. The church is crowned by a large cuple. The interior displays images from the first years of the City and also an image of Our Lady the Virgin of the Rosary, which first arrived at the Rímac Valley, Patron of the city, has deep relation with the Peruvian saints and by its remarkable devotion that was crowned in the year 1927 in a unique event in the religious history of the country. On the other hand, the convent, like all, has interesting claustros and in this case, with Sevillian style patios their typical tiles. Its capitulary room is of the baroque style. It is here, in 1551, that the National University of San Marcos was founded, the first in the Americas. The temple of Our Lady of the Rosary (original name of the church of Santo Domingo) was elevated to the category of basilica in 1930, and in its interior is the Altar of the Peruvian Saints, which is visited annually by thousands of residents of Peru and by many foreigners.

Basílica and Convent of San Francisco

This architectonic complex was constructed in the 17th century and is made up by the church and the convent of San Francisco, as well as of the chapels of the Solitude and the Miracle. During your visit their claustros can be appreciated, their patios adorned with Sevillian tiles and the library. Here it is the headquarters of the Museum of Religious Art and the Zurbarán Room. Under this complex there is a network of underground galleries and catacombs that were a cemetery at the colonial time and which are also very much visited.

Basílica La Merced

The Church of Merced was constructed in the 18th century with a churrigueresco style; appreciating it as much external as internally, the visitor occurs an idea of the splendor of the architecture of the time. In this church, full of works of art there is an emphasis on the greater altar in honor to the Virgin of Mercedes and one sacristía with arabesque tiles. Here it is possible to see one of the decks of collections of paintings and colonial statues of the city. The Virgin of the Mercedes is the patron of the Arms of the nation.

Sanctuary and Monastery of Las Nazarenas

Sanctuary where is venerated main Peruvian catholic devotion  Lord of Miracles, Señor de los Milagros, who is Patron of the city. It was constructed together with Monastery of Nazarenas nuns in the 18th century, after the 1746 Lima–Callao earthquake.

Basílica of San Pedro

Main church of Society of Jesus in Peru, it was constructed in 1638 as Church of San Pablo Apóstol. In 1767 it was called San Pedro.

Government Palace

The Government Palace is the residence of the President of the Republic. Its original name is the House of Pizarro but informally it is designated to him like the Palace of Government.

Torre Tagle Palace

The Palace of Torre Tagle probably is the most significant mansion built at the beginning of the 18th century. Initially it belonged to Don Bernardine Jose of Tagle Portocarrero, fourth and last Marquess of Torre Tagle. The Peruvian state acquired it in 1918 and from 1919 it is the main headquarters of the Ministry of Foreign Affairs of Peru. It is made of artistic Limean architecture which describes its originality and also demonstrates the racially mixed contributions of the Viceroyalty of Peru, fitting them together harmoniously. It has a carved stone cover and two balconies, that are authentic jewels of the City of the Kings. One is in perfect state of conservation.

University of San Marcos "Casona" and University Park
This park was constructed in 1870. In 1921 the park was located in where the cultural Center of the National University of San Marcos now stands. In the occasion of the centenary of the independence of the nation, the German colony arranged to construct the 30 meter Tower of the Clock. At noon, their bells touch notes of the national anthem.

Plaza Mayor

The Plaza Mayor is located where Francisco Pizarro founded Lima. Initially, there were small stores and commerce. Also, it was the scene of an excess of bulls and served like the site of execution of the condemned until death by the Court of Santa Inquisición. In 1651, a bronze battery was placed in the center of the seat that lasts to date. It was in the Plaza Mayor where it was proclaimed, in 1821, the Act of Independence of Peru. It is surrounded by the Palace by Government, the Municipality of Lima, the Cathedral and the Archbishop's Palace.

Plaza San Martín

This plaza was inaugurated in 1921 in the occasion of the centenary of the independence of Peru. In the central part, there is a monument in honor of General José de San Martín. It was built by the Catalan sculptor Mariano Benlliure. In this plaza of important buildings, the former Hotel Bolívar stands, which until the new millennium, was most elegant of Lima, as well as the Club Nacional, the watering hole for Lima's high society. The plaza has become one of the many symbols of Lima. Two buildings surrounding the plaza have caught fire in recent years: the Giacoletti Building, in 2018, and the Marcionelli Building, in 2023.

Plaza Dos de Mayo

Plaza dos de Mayo is a square built in 1874 by the Peruvian government to commemorate the Battle of Callao which occurred on 2 May 1866.

Court of Santo Oficio
The Court of Santo Oficio was established in 1569 with the purpose of sanctioning heresies and other crimes against the Catholic faith. Its abolition dates from 1820. On the external part of this monument it is possible to see an imposing neoclassic porch and, in the main hall, an outstanding carved wood ceiling, which is considered best in the city.

See also
 Iperú
 Tourism in Peru

References

External links
 Article in the Spanish newspaper ABC about the House of Aliaga Spanish
 About the Historical Center Spanish
 Religion in the City of the Kings of Peru Spanish
 360° view of Lima Main Square

Geography of Lima
Colonial Peru
World Heritage Sites in Peru
Cultural heritage of Peru
Tourist attractions in Lima
Historic districts
History of Lima